John McElroy may refer to: 
John McElroy (author) (1846–1929), American printer, newspaper publisher, soldier, journalist and author
John McElroy (Canada), Royal Canadian Air Force pilot, veteran of World War II, Mahal (Israel) in the 1948 Arab–Israeli War
John McElroy (Jesuit) (1782–1877), Jesuit priest
John McElroy (producer), audiobook producer, see 1998 Grammy Awards
John McElroy (blogger), Autoline Detroit blogger

See also

Jack McElroy (disambiguation)